Santha Pydipala is a village in Rowthulapudi Mandal in Kakinada district of Andhra Pradesh, India. It is close to Tuni and Annavaram towns. Its pin code is 533446. The local language is Telugu. The population of Santha Pydipala is 2196. The main occupation of the people is agriculture and stone crushers.

Geography 

Demographics 
 India census, S.Pydipala Village had a population of 2,196, out of which 1080 were male and 1116 were female. Population of children below 6 years of age were 237. The literacy rate of the village is 51.15%.
Village Name: S.Pydipala
Mandal Name: Rowthulapudi

District Name: East Godavari

State Name: Andhra Pradesh

Language: Telugu

Assembly Constituency: Prathipadu

Lok sabha Constituency: Kakinada

Pin code: 533446

Post office: S.Pydipala

Nearest Railway stations : Tuni, Annavaram and Pithapuram.

Temples in S.Pydipala : Ramalayam, kanakadurga, vinayaka and sai baba temples,nukalamma thalli temple.

Schools near S.Pydipala : MPUP School(S.Pydipala)

ZP High School(Rowthulapudi)

Colleges near S.Pydipala : Vijetha inter college

Surya degree college

Sri Prakash Engineering college

References

 "News about s.pydipala in sakshi paper" https://epaper.sakshi.com/2527192/East-Godavari-Constituencies/27-01-2020#prathipadu/1/2

Villages in Rowthulapudi mandal